Taken is a series of English-language French action films, beginning with Taken in 2008, created by producer Luc Besson and American screenwriter Robert Mark Kamen. The dialogue of all three films is primarily English, and all three feature Liam Neeson as Bryan Mills. The first film received mixed reviews from critics but a positive response from audiences with commercial success, the series grossed a combined $929,451,015 worldwide.

A prequel television series based on a similar storyline and starring Clive Standen as Bryan Mills premiered in February 2017.

The series has also experienced diminishing critical reception with each successive film.

Films

Taken (2008)

A retired CIA operative named Bryan Mills crosses the globe to rescue his 17-year-old daughter after she is kidnapped by a group of Albanian smugglers while traveling in France.

Taken 2 (2012)

Mafia boss and terrorist Murad, the father of Marko, whom Bryan had killed by electrocution in the first film of the trilogy, plans to capture Bryan, who is vacationing with his family in Istanbul, and avenge his son's death.

Taken 3 (2014)

Bryan has been framed for the murder of his ex-wife, Lenore. He then sets out to clear his name by going after the real killers, while also eluding capture from U.S. authorities for whom he formerly worked.

Television

Taken (2017–2018)

In September 2015, NBC ordered a Taken television series depicting a young Bryan Mills. In February 2016, Vikings actor Clive Standen was announced to play the young Bryan Mills, with Alex Carey as the showrunner.

Cast and crew

Cast

Crew

Reception

Box office performance

Critical and public response

In popular culture
 On January 15, 2015, to promote the American release of Taken 3, Liam Neeson starred in a short film on the show entitled Taken 4: A-Paco-Lypse on American talk show Jimmy Kimmel Live!; the short revolved around Bryan Mills helping his old friend Guillermo rescue his kidnapped dog, Paco from "Kimmel".
 In 2015, Liam Neeson portrayed a parody of Brian Mills in Ted 2 (credited as "Customer"), in which he shops at the supermarket Ted works at for Trix cereal, asking that no-one be sent after him due to it supposedly being "exclusively for kids", only for him to return the cereal in the post-credits scene after having been followed and attacked.
 In 2017, Bryan Mills was featured in the fifth season of the web television series The Most Popular Girls in School, in which he is searching France for his daughter Kim, after she was kidnapped by a rival group of French models while representing the United States as a model herself. Liam Neeson reprises his role as Mills.

References

External links
 

Film series introduced in 2008
20th Century Studios franchises
Action film franchises